Sphaerobothris is a genus of beetles in the family Buprestidae, containing the following species:

 Sphaerobothris aghababiani Volkovitsh & Kalashian, 1998
 Sphaerobothris dinauxi (Thery, 1935)
 Sphaerobothris globicollis (Reitter, 1895)
 Sphaerobothris platti (Cazier, 1938)
 Sphaerobothris ulkei (LeConte, 1860)

References

Buprestidae genera